The Alliance of Independent Journalists (abbreviated as AJI) is an Indonesian organization that promotes press freedom in the country.

The AJI was founded in 1994 by Satrio Arismunandar, Ahmad Taufik, Goenawan Mohamad, the founder and editor of Tempo magazine, and Ging Ginanjar in response to the banning by the Suharto government of three magazines: Tempo, Editor, and Detik. The organisation is a member of International Federation of Journalists (IFJ) and of the Southeast Asian Press Alliance (SEAPA). AJI is also a member organization of the Asian Forum for Human Rights and Development (FORUM-ASIA) and the Global Investigative Journalism Network.

Based in Jakarta, Indonesia, AJI is the first independent journalists' association in the country.

See also 

 International Federation of Journalists
 Southeast Asian Press Alliance
 Asian Forum for Human Rights and Development
 Global Investigative Journalism Network

References

External links
 AJI website
 Alliance of Independent Journalists at SourceWatch

Indonesian journalism organizations